Richard St. Clair's Three Movements for Wind Quintet is a composition for wind quintet that was written between the years 1997 and 2005.

Structure

The work is structured in three movements and takes around 11 minutes to perform:

 Introduction and Allegro (Molto Moderato - Doppio movimento - Piu mosso)
 Interlude: Lento
 Conclusion: Allegro moderato

External links

Compositions for wind quintet
2005 compositions